Kepahiang may refer to:
Kepahiang Regency, a regency (kabupaten) in Bengkulu province, Indonesia
Kepahiang District, a district (kecamatan) of Kepahiang Regency